Displays2go is a manufacturer and e-commerce retailer of point-of-sale displays based in Fall River, Massachusetts.

A subsidiary of TAKKT AG, this online business-to-business wholesaler markets its products mainly to retail stores and trade shows. The company adopted its current name in 1996 when it transitioned from a local acrylic display manufacturer to an online merchant, expanding its product line to include store fixtures, trade show supplies, retail media and digital marketing products.

History

1974–2011 

Founded in 1974 by George Patton, the company was originally an in-house display manufacturer known as George Patton Associates, Inc. Targeting mainly New England area businesses, GPA expanded rapidly due to Patton's persistent marketing efforts. In 1992, he sold the company to his sons, Tom and Chris.

Their catalog business quickly grew, forcing the company to acquire a larger warehouse. In 1997, plans were made to build a new 45,000 sq. ft plant near the company's location on Market St. in Warren, RI, but Warren's water main expansion fell 1600 feet short of where the Pattons planned to build the new warehouse, preventing its construction. Later that year, a purchase and sales agreement was signed on a second location in Warren for an estimated $1.4 million, but it fell through for undisclosed reasons. In 2000, GPA started building a 261,000 sq. ft warehouse and office building in Bristol, RI.
The company began focusing on Internet marketing and was renamed to Displays2go.

2012–present 

In 2012, Displays2go was acquired by the TAKKT Group (ETR: TTK), a subsidiary of the German conglomerate Franz Haniel & Cie., for $120 million. Felix Zimmerman, TAKKT Group's CEO, later on explained that the acquisition was made to "further diversify [the group's] product portfolio and noticeably extend [its] e-commerce competence."

References 

1974 establishments in the United States
Online retailers of the United States
Companies based in Rhode Island
Corporate subsidiaries